Saint-Germain-sur-Moine is a former commune in the Maine-et-Loire department in western France.

Geography
Saint-Germain-sur-Moine is located about 75 meters above sea level and is adjacent to the municipalities of Montfaucon-Montigné and Tillieres. 
The largest town near Saint-Germain-sur-Moine is the town of Cholet, situated 20 km south-east. 
The river Moine is the main river that runs through the town of Saint-Germain-sur-Moine.

History 
On 15 December 2015, Le Longeron, Montfaucon-Montigné, La Renaudière, Roussay, Saint-André-de-la-Marche, Saint-Crespin-sur-Moine, Saint-Germain-sur-Moine, Saint-Macaire-en-Mauges, Tillières and Torfou merged becoming one commune called Sèvremoine.

Twinned towns
  Lampeter, Wales

See also
Communes of the Maine-et-Loire department

References

Saintgermainsurmoine